Dirk Boonstra (24 February 1893 – 9 September 1944) was a police commander for the village of Grijpskerk in the Netherlands during World War II. For his refusal to carry out an order to round up the remaining Dutch Jews in the area he was recognized in 1988 as Righteous Among the Nations by the Yad Vashem.

References

External links
 Dirk Boonstra – his activity to save Jews' lives during the Holocaust, at Yad Vashem website

1893 births
1944 deaths
Dutch police officers
Dutch Righteous Among the Nations
People from Het Bildt
Dutch people who died in Nazi concentration camps
People who died in Flossenbürg concentration camp